"There You Are" is a song written by Mike Reid and Kye Fleming, and recorded by American country music artist Willie Nelson.  It was released in September 1989 as the second single from his album A Horse Called Music, and his last release in the 1980s. The song peaked at number 8 on the Billboard Hot Country Singles chart.

Chart performance

Year-end charts

References

1989 singles
Willie Nelson songs
Songs written by Mike Reid (singer)
Columbia Records singles
Songs written by Kye Fleming
1989 songs